The Our Lady of Guadalupe Cathedral (also Huajuapan de León Cathedral) is a Catholic church that serves as the headquarters of the Diocese of Huajuapan de Leon in Mexico since 1903. The building is located in the center of the city of Huajuapan de Leon, in the state of Oaxaca.

It is dedicated to the Virgin of Guadalupe. The church was built at the end of the 17th century and various extensions and modifications were made throughout the 19th century. It is decorated almost entirely in Neoclassical style.

The Diocese of Huajuapan de Leon was founded on 25 April 1902 by the papal bull "Apostolica Sedes" signed by Pope Leo XIII.

See also
Roman Catholicism in Mexico

References

Roman Catholic cathedrals in Mexico
Roman Catholic churches completed in 1812
19th-century Roman Catholic church buildings in Mexico